Barry Carter Sullivan (September 21, 1927 – June 5, 1989) was a professional ice hockey right winger who played in one National Hockey League game for the Detroit Red Wings during the 1947–48 season, on February 3, 1948 against the Chicago Black Hawks. The rest of his career, which lasted from 1945 to 1953, was spent in the minor leagues.

Career statistics

Regular season and playoffs

See also
 List of players who played only one game in the NHL

External links
 

1927 births
1989 deaths
Canadian ice hockey right wingers
Detroit Red Wings players
Galt Red Wings players
Ice hockey people from Ontario
Indianapolis Capitals players
New Haven Eagles players
Omaha Knights (USHL) players
Oshawa Generals players
Providence Reds players
St. Louis Flyers players
Sportspeople from Cambridge, Ontario
Stratford Kroehlers players